Muranaka (written: 村中 lit. "village center") is a Japanese surname. Notable people with the surname include:

, Japanese baseball player
Rika Muranaka, Japanese composer
, Japanese physician and journalist
, Japanese shogi player
, Japanese boxer
, Imperial Japanese Army officer
, Japanese voice actress

Japanese-language surnames